Sir Herbert James Read  (1863–1949) was the 22nd Governor of Mauritius from 19 February 1925 to 9 December 1929.

References 

1863 births
1949 deaths
Governors of British Mauritius
Commanders of the Order of the Crown (Belgium)
Knights Grand Cross of the Order of St Michael and St George
Companions of the Order of the Bath